Mainpuri Lok Sabha constituency is one of the 80 Lok Sabha (parliamentary) constituencies in the Indian state of Uttar Pradesh.

Assembly segments
Mainpuri constituency comprises five Vidhan Sabha (legislative assembly) segments. These are:

In Mainpuri, 45% of the 1.73 million voters are Yadavs. The other dominant castes are Shakya, Bhrahmins, Scheduled Castes and Muslims.

Members of Parliament

^ by-poll

Election results

By election 2022

2019

By election 2014

2014

2009

By election 2004

Lok Sabha election 2004

Lok Sabha election 1996

See also
 Mainpuri district
 List of Constituencies of the Lok Sabha

References

Lok Sabha constituencies in Uttar Pradesh
Mainpuri district